Lassi Kokkala (born March 20, 1989) is a Finnish professional ice hockey player.

Lassi Kokkala made his SM-liiga debut playing with Ilves during the 2006–07 SM-liiga season.

References

External links

1989 births
Living people
AaB Ishockey players
Finnish ice hockey centres
Hokki players
Ilves players
Vaasan Sport players
Stavanger Oilers players
HC TPS players
TuTo players
Sportspeople from Turku